Anang Hermansyah (born 18 March 1969) is an Indonesian singer, musician, producer and politician, who served as a member of the People's Representative Council from the East Java IV constituency as from 2014 until 2019. Since 2007, anang has been one of the judges for the singing talent contest, namely Indonesian Idol. Anang is the ex-husband of famous pop singer turned politician Krisdayanti.

Early life and education 
Anang attended elementary school in SD Jember Kidul in 1977, and entered middle school in SMP Negeri 1 Jember in 1983. He would go to SMA Negeri 4 Surabaya for highschool in 1986.

Musical career 
Anang has joined a band since high school in Jember, East Java. However, he only got serious about music when he was studying at the Islamic University of Bandung by joining Doel Sumbang's studio. Around this time Anang made a musical recording with Doel Sumbang, although it was not published.

Joined the band Kidnap Katrina:[4] In 1989, Anang decided to move to Jakarta and became acquainted with Pay Siburian, a BIP guitarist who was still playing for Slank. Through Pay, Anang also joined the Gang Potlot social circle and later strengthened the Kidnap Katrina group founded by Massto[5] (Bimbim Slank's sister[6]) and Koko (sister of Kaka Slank[7]). Together with Kidnap Katrina, Anang released a self-titled album[8] with his hits entitled "Biru"[9] in 1993.

Going solo: After leaving Kidnap Katrina, Anang decided to go solo and released albums, including Letlah, Lepas, Melayang and Tania. Together with his wife, Krisdayanti, Anang released the album Cinta, Kasih, Buah Hati and Makin Aku Cinta. After he divorced Krisdayanti, he released his album Half My Soul Go. He also duets with Syahrini in the song Don't Choose Me. This song managed to score a huge success. He then also sang a second duet, entitled The Last Love with Syahrini.

In 2011 he ended his duet with Syahrini and took Ashanty as his new duet partner. Their relationship progressed from being just a duet of friends into lovers and eventually getting married. The couple Anang and Ashanty released an album entitled My Soulmate and gave birth to 2 hits, Determining My Heart and My Soulmate.

Apart from singing success, Anang is also a songwriter, arranger and producer for several singers, including his wife, Krisdayanti, while managing Studio Hijau, his recording studio. Anang also successfully held the 3 Diva Concert, which involved his wife, Krisdayanti, as well as Titi DJ and Ruth Sahanaya. Not only in the world of singing, Anang has also spread his wings in the world of acting by producing a film entitled "The Difficulty of Being a Virgin". This film is supported by Restu Sinaga, Nova Eliza, Al Fathir Muchtar, Olga Syahputra, Tio Pakusadewo, Julia Perez.

Political career

Personal life 
Anang married Krisdayanti on August 22, 1996, together they have 2 children : Titania Aurelie Hermansyah and Azriel Akbar Hermansyah. However, their marriage has often been hit by gossip. In 2009, the couple divorced religiously in August, then legally divorced in November. Anang remarried to Ashanty, proposing to her on February 25, 2012. Together, Anang and Ashanty have 2 children : Arsy and Arsya.

Discography 

Album solo
 Biarkanlah (1992)
 Lepas (1994)
 Melayang (1996)
 Tania (1999)
 Jati Diri 1969 (2001)
 Mata Cinta (2003)
 Separuh Jiwaku Pergi (2009)

Album duet
 Cinta (1996)
 Kasih (1997)
 Buah Hati (1998)
 Makin Aku Cinta (2000)
 Menuju Terang (2003)
 Sepuluh Tahun Pertama (2006)
 Dilanda Cinta (2009)
 Jangan Memilih Aku (2010)
 Tanpa Bintang (2010)
 Jodohku (2011)
 Luar Biasa (2019)
 Cinta Tanpa Syarat (2021)

References 

Living people
1969 births
Indonesian musicians
Indonesian politicians